

The Lehmann discontinuity is an abrupt increase of P-wave and S-wave velocities at the depth of , discovered by seismologist Inge Lehmann. The thickness is 220 km .  It appears beneath continents, but not usually beneath oceans, and does not readily appear in globally averaged studies. Several explanations have been proposed: a lower limit to the pliable asthenosphere, a phase transition, and most plausibly, depth variation in the shear wave anisotropy. Further discussion of the Lehmann discontinuity can be found in the book Deformation of Earth Materials by Shun-ichirō Karato.

Notes

General references
 – some historic background.

External links
Inge Lehmann, UCLA
Career highlights of Inge Lehmann from UCLA

Structure of the Earth